Dingosa is a genus of spiders in the family Lycosidae. It was first described in 1955 by Roewer. , it contains 6 species from Australia and from South America.

Species
Dingosa comprises the following species:
Dingosa humphreysi (McKay, 1985)
Dingosa liopus (Chamberlin, 1916)
Dingosa murata Framenau & Baehr, 2007
Dingosa serrata (L. Koch, 1877)
Dingosa simsoni (Simon, 1898)
Dingosa venefica (Keyserling, 1891)

References

Lycosidae
Araneomorphae genera
Spiders of South America
Spiders of Australia